Saint Theresa's College may refer to:

Australia
St. Teresa's College, Abergowrie

India
St. Teresa's College, Kochi, India

Philippines
Saint Theresa's College of Cebu
Saint Theresa's College of Quezon City 
Saint Theresa College of Tandag
Santa Teresa College, Bauan, Batangas

Spain
College of Saint Teresa-Ganduxer, Barcelona, Spain

United States
College of Saint Teresa, Winona, Minnesota

See also
Saint Teresa (disambiguation)
Saint Teresa's School (disambiguation)